Edward McKey Hallowell (born December 2, 1949) is an American psychiatrist, speaker, New York Times best-selling author and podcast host. He specializes in ADHD (attention deficit hyperactivity disorder) and is the founder of the Hallowell ADHD Centers. Hallowell is the author of 20 books, including the Distraction series, co-authored with Dr. John Ratey.

Education
Hallowell is an alumnus of Phillips Exeter Academy, Harvard College and Tulane University School of Medicine. He received a bachelor's degree in English from Harvard College and a medical degree from the Tulane University School of Medicine. Hallowell completed his residency in adult and child psychiatry at Harvard Medical School.

ADHD career
Hallowell has been treating people of all ages with ADHD since 1981, and has stated that he has dyslexia and ADHD, which is self-diagnosed. His approach to the condition uses a strength-based model—developed with Driven to Distraction co-author Dr. John Ratey—that is based on the tenets of positive psychology and takes a more holistic view of ADHD, rather than seeing it purely as a disorder with negative symptoms. This model was new to the field.

Using this treatment model, Hallowell founded the ADHD Hallowell Centers to support and treat people with ADHD. There are currently six locations in the United States, including New York City, Seattle and Boston. Hallowell states that there are four key aspects to treatment for ADHD: 1) learning as much as possible about the condition in order to "know what it is, and what it is not" and to understand the specific symptoms that a person has; 2) getting a coach to help with the executive functioning type tasks that people with ADHD tend to struggle with; 3) lifestyle changes, including good nutrition, sleep and physical exercise; and 4) medication, if it is beneficial for the individual. Hallowell has stated that "the biggest problem we face in terms of the perception of ADHD is ignorance and stigma." He has also stated that "contentiousness around ADHD is simply rooted in ignorance." Hallowell believes ADHD is due to a "biochemical imbalance in the brain".

On September 15, 2005, Hallowell said, "Whenever you get someone with ADHD diagnosed and treated successfully, everyone wins. Along with behavioral therapy, medication is good because it can improve adults' relationships, parenting skills, job performance, even their sex lives". In a 2013 interview, Hallowell said that, when used properly, stimulant medication is safe and benefits patients with ADHD in 80% of cases. He said children as young as 4 years old can use it and that his oldest patient was 86 years old. Hallowell estimated that 15% of the population have ADHD. The DSM state 5% have it.

Hallowell believes that Adderall and other stimulant drugs are safer than aspirin. He also believes Coffee is more toxic than Adderall. Hallowell has been a paid consultant for McNeil Pediatrics, who make stimulant drugs including Adderall and Concerta.

In 2018, he said, "prisons are full of people with undiagnosed ADHD, as are the lines of the unemployed, the marginalized, the addicted and the depressed. ADHD can ruin a person's life, or hold them back from ever reaching their full potential". A study conducted in 2018 found that 25% of the prison population had undiagnosed ADHD.

Hallowell supports the official and updated definition of ADHD developed by the DSM-5 Task Force. ADHD does not always include hyperactivity, and Hallowell says that this type, known as ADHD Inattentive Type, occurs frequently in women. In 2020, Hallowell said that the term Attention Deficit Hyperactivity Disorder is a horrible term, and that "individuals with ADHD don't have a deficiency of attention, but an abundance of it." Hallowell claims that ADHD does not always include hyperactivity but can include an inability to follow through on assignments at work or at school, misplacing things, avoiding tasks or getting distracted easily. Hallowell also believes that hyperactivity can be a misleading symptom and can lead to individuals going undiagnosed in some cases. Hallowell has described the ADHD brain as a Ferrari engine with bicycle brakes.

Hallowell and Ratey created a new term, VAST (Variable Attention Stimulus Trait), to describe ADHD more effectively, and wrote about this extensively in their new book, published in January 2021. VAST derives from the fact that people with ADHD are drawn to high stimulation situations and their attention varies based on the level of stimulation within the situation. Hallowell also created the term sensitive euphoria: when individuals with ADHD are criticized or rejected, they typically wilt, while forms of encouragement and recognition help them immensely.

Hallowell has written over 20 books on ADHD and other psychological topics, writes a monthly blog about the topic and is a regular contributor to ADDitude Magazine. He also serves on the ADHD Medical Review Panel for ADDitude. In 2018, he was awarded the National Alliance on Mental Illness' Leader of Mental Health Awareness Award. Hallowell has been a podcast host since 2015. In October 2020, he began posting educational videos on TikTok.

In May 2015 Hallowell asserted that "The people who colonized this country were loaded with the ADHD genes, hence our current gene pool is well stocked with ADHD. It has driven our greatest successes–but is also why we are such a violent nation.

Books 
Hallowell has authored 20 books. His Distraction series, co-authored with Dr John Ratey, is focused on a strength-based approach to ADHD.

Distraction series 

 ADHD 2.0: New Science and Essential Strategies for Thriving with Distraction – From Childhood Through Adulthood – January 12, 2021
Driven to Distraction (Revised): Recognizing and Coping with Attention Deficit Disorder Paperback – September 13, 2011, with John Ratey
 Answers to Distraction – January 12, 2010, with John Ratey
 Delivered from Distraction: Getting the Most out of Life with Attention Deficit Disorder – December 27, 2005, with John Ratey
 Driven to Distraction at Work: How to Focus and Be More Productive – January 1, 2003
 Married to Distraction: How to Restore Intimacy and Strengthen Your Partnership in an Age of Interruption – February 8, 2011, with Sue Hallowell

Other books 
Finding the Heart of the Child (1993) Essays on Children, Families, and Schools – January 1, 1997
When You Worry About The Child You Love (1997) – August 27, 1997
Worry: Hope and Help for a Common Condition – September 14, 1998
Connect: 12 Vital Ties That Open Your Heart, Lengthen Your Life, and Deepen Your Soul – April 1, 2001
Human Moments: How to Find Meaning and Love in Your Everyday Life – September 7, 2001
Shine: Using Brain Science to Get the Best from Your People – January 13, 2011
The Childhood Roots of Adult Happiness: Five Steps to Help Kids Create and Sustain Lifelong Joy – August 26, 2003
A Walk in the Rain With a Brain – Picture Book, September 28, 2004
Dare to Forgive: The Power of Letting Go and Moving On – January 15, 2006
Crazy Busy: Overstretched, Overbooked, and About to Snap! Strategies for Handling Your Fast-Paced Life – March 27, 2007
Superparenting for ADD: An Innovative Approach to Raising Your Distracted Child – February 23, 2010
Because I Come From A Crazy Family (The Making of a Psychiatrist) – June 12, 2018

TV appearances

Hallowell has appeared on television several times discussing ADHD. He has appeared on 20/20, 60 Minutes, the BBC, CNN, Dateline, Good Morning America, The Jane Pauley Show, The Oprah Winfrey Show, The Dr. Phil Show, PBS, The Today Show, The View, and many local news programs. He also has appeared on the Revolution show with Ty Pennington and Jennifer Ashton.

Personal life
Hallowell grew up in Chatham, Massachusetts. His father had bipolar disorder and initially received psychiatric treatment for misdiagnosed schizophrenia. His mother remarried and subsequently divorced an abusive alcoholic. Hallowell had two brothers: John, who became a Hollywood reporter and died in 2015, and Ben, who graduated from the Naval Academy.

Hallowell lives in the Boston, Massachusetts, area with his wife, Sue, a social worker. They have three adult children.

Legal issue
In May 2015, Hallowell was charged for allegedly groping a makeup artist at an interview taping in 2014. Hallowell did not dispute the claim and told police the incident was a misunderstanding and any touching was "inadvertent".  The accuser later said, "I may have misconstrued Dr. Hallowell’s intention, as he did nothing beyond the initial contact", and that she did not wish for Hallowell to be prosecuted. In September 2015, a judge ordered the charges to be dropped.

References

External links

Living people
Hallowell family
Attention deficit hyperactivity disorder researchers
Phillips Exeter Academy alumni
Harvard College alumni
Tulane University School of Medicine alumni
Harvard Medical School faculty
American psychiatrists
1949 births
Scientists with dyslexia